This is a list of additionally guyed towers.

See also
 List of partially guyed towers

References

Additionally guyed
Guyed masts
Towers, additionally guyed